Kei Nishikori was the defending champion but chose not to participate.
James Blake defeated Alex Bogomolov Jr. in the final (6–2, 6–2) to win the title.

Seeds

  Ryan Sweeting (semifinals)
  Michael Russell (quarterfinals)
  Go Soeda (second round)
  Donald Young (second round)
  Brian Dabul (first round, retired due to fatigue)
  Alex Bogomolov Jr. (final)
  Éric Prodon (quarterfinals, withdrew due to an abdominal strain)
  Ryan Harrison (first round)

Draw

Finals

Top half

Bottom half

References
 Main Draw
 Qualifying Draw

2011 ATP Challenger Tour
2011 Singles